Oghara Township Stadium is a multi-use stadium in Oghara, Nigeria.  It is currently used mostly for football matches and hosted some of the final tournaments for the 2006 Women's African Football Championship. The stadium has a capacity of 8,000 people. The stadium has served as the temporary homes of Bayelsa teams Ocean Boys F.C. and Bayelsa United.

References 

Football venues in Nigeria